Kanek may refer to:

 Kan Ek', the name of various kings of the Itza Maya
 Kanik, a village in Iran